Green Room Serenade, Part One is an album by American roots music band Lost Dogs. Named after Gene Eugene's Huntington Beach recording studio, The Green Room, it was released on BAI Records in 1996.

Track listing
"The Green Room Serenade" (Taylor)  (1:42)
"Up in the Morning" (Taylor)  (5:19)
"Cry Baby" (Eugene)  (3:01)
"Love Takes Over The World" (Taylor)  (4:37)
"Close But No Cigar" (Taylor)  (2:57)
"All That Remains" (Taylor)  (5:21)
"Sweet Work of Love" (Taylor)  (5:26)
"If it Be Your Will" (Leonard Cohen)  (3:59)
"Mexico" (Eugene)  (4:10)
"The Prodigal Bride (I'll Wait For You)" (Taylor)  (4:48)
"Hey, You Little Devil" (Taylor/Daugherty/Eugene)  (3:40)
"I Don't Love You" (Roe)  (2:51)
"Reasonable Service" (Taylor)  (5:01)
"Waiting For You to Come Around" (Daugherty/Eugene)  (5:55)
"Breathe Deep (The Breath of God) - 1996" (Taylor)  (4:15)

The band
Derri Daugherty — vocals, electric and acoustic guitars, bass
Gene Eugene — vocals, Fender Rhodes electric piano, B-3 organ, guitars, bass
Mike Roe — vocals, lead guitar, acoustic guitar, bass
Terry Scott Taylor — vocals, acoustic guitars

Additional musicians
Tim Chandler — bass
Burleigh Drummond — drums
Greg Kellogg — pedal steel, banjo, dobro
James Sitterly — violin

Production notes
 Recorded and Mixed by Gene Eugene and Lost Dogs at The Green Room, Huntington Beach.
 B-3 Recorded at Desert Moon, Anaheim.
 Additional Engineering by Eric Tokle.
 Art Direction, Design, Concepts, Photography and Clay Sculptures by the "Fabulous" Anna Cardenas.

References

Lost Dogs albums
1996 albums